"The Cheap Seats" is a song by American country music group Alabama, released on April 4, 1994, as the third and final single from their album Cheap Seats. "The Cheap Seats" was written by Marcus Hummon and Randy Sharp, and peaked at number 13 on the Billboard Hot Country Singles & Tracks chart in mid-1994. It also peaked at number 6 on the Canadian RPM Country Tracks. The song was used as the theme song for Minor League Baseball games broadcast on ESPN in August and September 1994 during the 1994-95 MLB strike.

Critical reception
Dan Cooper of Allmusic called the song "way cute" in his review of the album. Tom Roland of New Country magazine praised the song for "avoiding the now-stale Dixie tributes" that were present in the band's other songs.

Music video
The music video was directed by Deaton-Flanigen and features the band at a baseball game.  It is strongly implied that Des Moines, Iowa is the "middle-sized town" in question, as it does indeed have a AAA minor league team (Iowa Cubs) and is in fact "in the middle of the Midwest". It was filmed at historic Engel Stadium in Chattanooga, Tennessee, a staged game between the Carolina Mudcats and Chattanooga Lookouts, members of the Double-A Southern League at the time. It was also filmed in the band's hometown of Fort Payne, Alabama.

Chart performance
"The Cheap Seats" debuted at number 65 on the U.S. Billboard Hot Country Singles & Tracks for the week of April 16, 1994.

Year-end charts

References

1994 singles
1993 songs
Alabama (American band) songs
Songs written by Marcus Hummon
Songs written by Randy Sharp
Song recordings produced by Josh Leo
RCA Records singles
Music videos directed by Deaton-Flanigen Productions
Baseball songs and chants